The 2016 Ivan Hlinka Memorial Tournament was an under-18 international ice hockey tournament held in Břeclav, Czech Republic and Bratislava, Slovakia from 8 to 13 August 2016.

Preliminary round
All times are Central European Summer Time (UTC+2).

Group A

Group B

Final round

Seventh place game

Fifth place game

Semifinals

Bronze medal game

Gold medal game

Final standings

See also
2016 IIHF World U18 Championships
2016 World Junior Championships

External links
 Ivan Hlinka Memorial 2016
 U18 Ivan Hlinka Memorial 2016

Ivan Hlinka Memorial Tournament
2016
International ice hockey competitions hosted by Slovakia
International ice hockey competitions hosted by the Czech Republic
Ivan
Ivan